Imidazoline is a class of heterocycles formally derived from imidazoles by the reduction of one of the two double bonds. Three isomers are known, 2-imidazolines, 3-imidazolines, and 4-imidazolines. The 2- and 3-imidazolines contain an imine center, whereas the 4-imidazolines contain an alkene group. The 2-Imidazoline group occurs in several drugs.

References